List of George Floyd protests may refer to:

 List of George Floyd protests in the United States
 List of George Floyd protests outside the United States